Willibald P. Pahr (born in Vienna on 5 June 1930) is an Austrian politician and diplomat.

Biography 
From 1976 to 1983, he was Austrian Minister of Foreign Affairs, from 1983 to 1986 he served as ambassador to Germany. From 1986 to 1989 he held the post of Secretary-General of the World Tourism Organization and from 1990 to 1995 he served as Commissioner for Refugees in the Austrian Ministry of the Interior.

References
 PAHR, Willibald P. International Who's Who. accessed September 1, 2006.

Foreign ministers of Austria
Ambassadors of Austria to West Germany
1930 births
Living people
World Tourism Organization people
Austrian officials of the United Nations